Hype Luxury Mobility is a luxury car rental company headquartered in Bangalore, India. It provides luxury cars, yachts and private jets for rent in India, UAE ,and UK.

History 
The Hype was founded by Raghav Belavadi in 2017.  Before this, Raghav founded InsurTech, ANDIAST Tech.AG, in Switzerland. He was the Executive Vice President at Accenture in Switzerland, Canada, and India. Prior to that, he was Program Director at Mercer, both in the UK and India.

Fleet 
Hype has operations in 19 cities across India including Ahmedabad, Bangalore, Chandigarh, Chennai, Cochin, Coimbatore, Delhi NCR, Goa, Hyderabad, Indore, Jaipur, Jodhpur, Kolkata, Mangalore, Mumbai, Madurai and, Pondicherry. It has a fleet size of more than 14,000 with over 6,000 luxury and 8,000 premium cars. The brands in its fleet include Rolls-Royce, Mercedes, Lamborghini, Ferrari, Maserati, Jaguar etc. Users book cars for rent directly from its website or through its mobile app.

It has a fleet of yachts including Bayliner 340, Ferretti 550, Island Spirit 401, Grand Soliel 45, Sea Ray 330, Azimut 39, Rinker 260, Free Spirit, Majesty 66 etc.

It has also partnered with aircraft operators to provide helicopters and private jets rentals.

Funding  
Hype Luxury said in a statement it had raised an undisclosed amount in Pre-Series A funding from Razorpay co-founders Harshil Mathur and Shashank Kumar's early-stage startup fund MarsShot Ventures.

Partnerships 
 HYPE has partnered with CRED, founded by Mr Kunal Shah to offer deals for all premium Cred users. 
 American Express had partnership with Hype to provide luxury travel experience for its Platinum and Centurion Card members.
 Hype has partnered with ICICI to provide special deals to its credit and debit card customers.

References 

Car rental companies of India
Companies based in Bangalore